The film production company ‘Aitysh Film’ was founded by public figure, producer and director Sadyk Sher-Niyaz in 2006 in Bishkek, Kyrgyzstan as a branch of Aitysh Public Fund. The purpose of the film company is the development of Kyrgyz cinema by supporting the creativity of talented young people. The company produces art-house, animation and documentary films.

Apart from Sadyk Sher-Niyaz, the other founders of Aitysh Film are Farkhad Bekmanbetov, Bakytbek Turdubaev and Akzholtoy Bekbolotov. The Director of the film company is Farkhad Bekmanbetov.

Filmography

Awards and Festival participation 

‘A Son’s Duty’
- Participation in Clermont-Ferrand International Short Film Festival and Hamburg Short Film Festival
- Special Jury Prize: International Tehran Film Festival
- Selected in the French Catalogue of Short Films 2007
- Special Prize: Eurasia International Film Festival, Astana, Kazakhstan

‘First Frame’
- Diploma for Best Music: International Festival of the ‘Shanghai Cooperation Organisation’ countries
- Diploma for Best Screenplay: 4th International Film Festival of the CIS and Baltic States ‘New Cinema’

‘City’
Diploma for Best Debut: International Festival of ‘Shanghai Cooperation Organisation’ countries

‘Everything’s OK’
- First prize: ‘Odan’ International Festival of Student Works (Turkey)
- Special Jury Prize: ‘Start’ Festival of Student Works (Azerbaijan)
- Grand Prix prize: 15th International Tehran Film Festival (Iran)
- 2nd prize: Dubai International Film Festival (United Arab Emirates)
- ARTE prize: Dresden International Film Festival (Germany)
- Grand Prix prize: ‘Kyrgyzstan-Germany-France’ Festival (Kyrgyzstan)
- Special Jury Prize: ‘Urban’ International Film Festival (Iran)
- Grand Prix prize: 1st National Film Festival Young Cinema ‘Umut’ (Kyrgyzstan)
- Special Jury Prize Film Festival of SCO member countries (Kyrgyzstan)
- Participation in International Film Festival Rotterdam (Netherlands)

International Film Festival ‘Kyrgyzstan - Land of Short Films’ 

Since 2011, Aitysh Film, together with the Department of Cinematography of the Kyrgyz Republic and with the assistance of the International Humanitarian Cooperation Fund has hosted an annual international film festival Kyrgyzstan - Land of Short Films for the Commonwealth of Independent States, the Baltic States, and Georgia. The festival has two competition programs, National and International, and awards are given in four categories: Best Film, Best Director, Special Jury Prize, and People's Choice Award. By tradition, the opening of the festival on 12 December marks the birthday of the famous national author Chingiz Aitmatov who died in 2008. Aitmatov was also a screenwriter and former Head of the Union of Filmmakers of Kyrgyzstan.

Film studios
Cinema of Kyrgyzstan